Pak Gyong-chol is the name of:

Pak Gyong-chol (North Korean football goalkeeper)
Pak Gyong-chol (North Korean football midfielder)